Barbara Potter (born October 22, 1961) is a former tennis player from the United States, who competed professionally on the WTA Tour between 1978 and 1989, winning six singles titles and 19 doubles titles. Her highest singles ranking was No. 7 in December 1982.

Career
Potter started playing tennis when she was eight years old. After graduating from Taft School in Watertown, Connecticut in 1978 Potter elected to turn professional instead of accepting an offer of admission at Princeton. A left-hander, she reached the semifinals at the U.S. Open in 1981 as well as the quarterfinals at the Australian Open in 1984, and Wimbledon in 1982, 1983 and 1985. At the WTA Tour Championships, she reached the semifinals in singles in 1984 and was a runner-up in doubles with Sharon Walsh in 1981.

Potter reached a career high ranking of No. 7 in 1982 and that year won the singles titles at the Avon Championships of Cincinnati and the US Indoor Championships. She also played in three Grand Slam doubles finals, the 1982 US Open women's doubles with Sharon Walsh as well as the 1982 and 1983 US Open mixed doubles with Ferdi Taygan.

In 1986, Potter suffered two herniated disks in her back at a tournament in England and was forced off the tour several times. After a grueling exercise and fitness program, she successfully returned to the tour.

She was a member of the 1982 and 1984 U.S. Wightman Cup teams and the 1988 United States Fed Cup team. In 1989, she re-aggravated a persistent back condition at the beginning season when she was involved in an automobile accident. She retired in November 1989 due to deteriorating hip cartilage.

Potter currently resides in Harlem, Georgia.

Major finals

Grand Slam finals

Women's doubles (1 runner–up)

Mixed doubles (2 runners-up)

Year-End Championships finals

Doubles: (1 runner–up)

WTA career finals

Singles: 14 (6–8)

Doubles: 41 (19–22)

Grand Slam performance timelines

Singles

Doubles

References

External links
 
 
 

1961 births
Taft School alumni
Living people
American female tennis players
People from Columbia County, Georgia
Sportspeople from Waterbury, Connecticut
Tennis people from Connecticut
21st-century American women